The 1978 Atlantic hurricane season was the last Atlantic hurricane season to use an all-female naming list. The season officially began on June 1, and ended on November 30. It was an above average season due to a subsiding El Niño. The first storm, a subtropical storm, developed unusually early – on January 18 – and dissipated five days later without causing any damage. There were 33 deaths and US$110 million (equivalent to $ million in ) in damage. Tropical Storm Bess and Hurricane Cora resulted in only minor land impacts, while the latter was attributed to one fatality.

Later in August, Tropical Storm Debra produced widespread effects on the US Gulf Coast, though damage was also relatively minor. Hurricane Ella became the northernmost Category 4 hurricane while located at 38°N, and lashed the East Coast of the United States and Atlantic Canada with gusty winds and rip currents. Hurricanes Flossie and Kendra as well as tropical storms Hope, Irma, and Juliet had minimal land impacts as tropical cyclones. However, the precursor to Kendra caused flooding in Puerto Rico. Hurricane Greta brought strong winds, high tides, and flooding to Central America, particularly Belize and Honduras. Greta resulted in about $25 million in damage and at least five fatalities. The storm crossed into the eastern Pacific and was renamed Olivia. Overall, the storms of this season collectively caused $191 million in damage and 42 fatalities.

Season summary 

The Atlantic hurricane season officially began on June 1, 1978. Although 24 tropical cyclones developed, only twelve of them reached tropical storm intensity, which is slightly above the 1966-2009 average of 11.3 named storms per season. Of the twelve tropical storms, five of them strengthened into a hurricane, which is slightly below the 1966-2009 average of 6.2. Two of the five hurricane became major hurricanes, which is Category 3 or greater on the Saffir–Simpson hurricane wind scale. Three tropical storms and two hurricanes made landfall during the season. Collectively, the tropical cyclones of the 1978 season caused at least 41 fatalities and $135 million. Additionally, the precursor to Hurricane Kendra brought flooding to Puerto Rico, with $6 million in damage and one death. The season officially ended on November 30, 1978.

Tropical cyclogenesis began very early, with the development of a subtropical storm on January 18. It dissipated about five days later. However, the next tropical cyclone, an unnumbered depression, did not develop until June 21. In July, there were two systems, including an unnumbered tropical depression and Tropical Storm Amelia. Seven tropical cyclones formed in August, including Tropical Depression Four, tropical storms Bess and Debra and hurricanes Cora and Ella. There were also seven systems in September – tropical depressions Eight, Nine, and Twelve, Tropical Storm Hope, and hurricanes Flossie and Greta. During the month of October, there were five tropical cyclones, with two unnumbered tropical depressions, tropical storms Irma and Juliet, and Hurricane Kendra. There was another unnumbered tropical depression in November, which dissipated on November 5.

The season's activity was reflected with an accumulated cyclone energy (ACE) rating of 63. ACE is a metric used to express the energy used by a tropical cyclone during its lifetime. Therefore, a storm with a longer duration will have high values of ACE. It is only calculated at six-hour increments in which specific tropical and subtropical systems are either at or above sustained wind speeds of 39 mph (63 km/h), which is the threshold for tropical storm intensity.

Systems

Subtropical Storm One 

In the middle of January, an upper-level trough in the westerlies spawned a surface low-pressure area to the east-northeast of the Lesser Antilles and to the south of a subtropical ridge. Isolated from the detrimental effects of the westerlies, it was initially non-tropical in nature and intensified through a baroclinic energy source, or one that derives energy from the interaction of cold and warm air. The National Hurricane Center (NHC) initiated Dvorak classifications on the cyclone at 0000 UTC on January 19, assessing a Dvorak number of T2.5, suggesting both tropical and subtropical characteristics. On the same day, the pressure gradient between the storm and the ridge produced gale-force winds. By early on January 20, the storm maintained minimal convection near its center, with its primary rainband revolved in a cyclonic formation around its well-defined center.

After the storm maintained peak winds for about 36 hours, the outer rainbands to the south and east of the center began diminishing late on January 21, which began a weakening trend. At around that time, the cyclone was moving west-southwestward, and within 72 hours was forecast by one hurricane forecast model to be located over Hispaniola. By midday on January 22, the winds decreased to below gale force after the convection dissipated near the center. The storm was one of six tropical or subtropical cyclones on record to be active in the month of January, and one of four to have formed in the month.

Tropical Storm Amelia 

A tropical wave emerged into the Atlantic Ocean from the west coast of Africa on July 19. The wave did not develop significantly while crossing the Atlantic Ocean and Caribbean Sea. Around that time, Amelia made landfall near Port Isabel, Texas. Later on July 31, the storm weakened to a tropical depression and dissipated early the following day.

Amelia affected the Texas coast for two days, causing several shipping incidents and minor damage in Corpus Christi and South Padre Island. While active, there were no deaths linked to the storm. However, the biggest impact from the storm followed its dissipation, when its remnants contributed to record rainfall totals over the state. The state, already suffering from a previous drought, believed that the rain would help alleviate the conditions. However, the dry ground aided the flooding from the storm. The rainfall caused several rivers and creeks to flood, especially around the Texas Hill Country and northern Texas, leading to severe damage. Overall, Amelia caused 33 fatalities with an estimated $110 million in damages.

Tropical Storm Bess 

A low-pressure area developed in Georgia along a dissipating cold front on August 1. The system detached from the cold front and drifted southwestward, reaching northeastern Gulf of Mexico on August 3. Satellite imagery, buoys, and reconnaissance aircraft flights indicated that by August 5, the system likely acquired a closed circulation. Thus, the National Hurricane Center estimated that a tropical depression developed in the central Gulf of Mexico at 1200 UTC that day.

Thereafter, Bess began to turn nearly due southward under the influence of a high-pressure area over southern Texas. Early on August 8, Bess made landfall near Nautla, Veracruz, at the same intensity and then rapidly dissipated inland. In Tuxpan, Veracruz and Tampico, Tamaulipas, sustained winds reached only . However, no flooding occurred and no damage or fatalities were reported. Its remnants emerged into the Pacific Ocean, leading to the formation of Hurricane Iva.

Hurricane Cora 

A disturbance exited the west coast of Africa on August 4 and developed into a tropical depression about three days later, while located well east of the Lesser Antilles. On August 8, the depression strengthened into Tropical Storm Cora. The storm moved at an unusually high forward speed for a cyclone in the Atlantic Ocean in August, and intensified into a hurricane later that day. The hurricane was upgraded into a hurricane based solely on satellite photography, the second time this occurred. Around 0000 UTC the next day, Cora weakened to a tropical storm while moving west-southwestward. The storm made landfall on Grenada on August 11, while weakening to a tropical depression. Cora weakened further to a tropical depression, before losing its circulation and degenerating into a tropical wave on August 12. The remnant crossed over Central America into the Pacific Ocean, where it regenerated into Hurricane Kristy.

Cora was an unusual cyclone, maintaining an unusually low latitude in the Atlantic in August at high speeds. While passing through the Lesser Antilles, gusty winds and light rainfall in Barbados and Saint Lucia. In the latter, a person died after stepping on a high tension power line that was downed in Castries. Approximately two to four percent of trees on the island were toppled. Cora was also responsible for altering weather conditions in Presque Isle, Maine, allowing for a takeoff of the historical flight of the Double Eagle II hot air balloon.

Tropical Storm Debra 

A low-pressure area that developed over southeast Florida and an area of convection near the Yucatán Peninsula merged and resulted in the formation of a tropical depression over the southern Gulf of Mexico on August 26. Tacking west-northwestward around a high-pressure ridge, the depression gradually intensified began and was upgraded to Tropical Storm Debra on August 28. It was a disorganized storm, with most of the convection located to the east of the center. The system weakened rapidly and dissipated over Arkansas on August 29, though its remnants continued into the Ohio Valley.

One person died while attempting to evacuate an oil rig to the south of Cameron, Louisiana. Damage caused by Debra was considered minimal. However, no flooding was reported. Wind impacts were light and mainly limited to down trees and damage to roofs in Lake Charles and New Orleans. The storm spawned several tornadoes in Arkansas, Mississippi, Louisiana, Tennessee, and Texas. In Mississippi, a tornado in Crystal Springs destroyed three mobile homes and a house, killing one person and seriously injuring another.

Hurricane Ella 

A cold front spawned a tropical disturbance near Bermuda, which became a tropical depression on August 30. The depression strengthened, and by early on August 31, it was upgraded to Tropical Storm Ella. Ship reports indicated that Ella became a hurricane later that day. A short-wave trough over the Eastern United States caused Ella to decelerate and turn north. Simultaneously, dry air diminished convection on September 2, which in turn resulted in weakening. Eventually, another trough forced Ella to re-curve northeastward, thereby remaining well offshore the East Coast of the United States.

Ella threatened to pass within  of North Carolina. Because of this, a hurricane watch was issued for the Outer Banks of North Carolina during Labor Day Weekend, resulting in a significant decrease in tourism. However, because the storm veered northeastward, little effects other than  waves, minor beach erosion, and light winds in coastal portions of North Carolina.

Hurricane Flossie 

A tropical wave passed westward across Dakar, Senegal on August 31 and entered the Atlantic Ocean later that day. Convection markedly increased over the next few days and by 0000 UTC on September 4, the wave developed into a tropical depression while located about midway between Africa and the Lesser Antilles. Later that day, the Hong Kong Merchant reported tropical storm force winds, thus the depression was upgraded to Tropical Storm Flossie. On September 5, the storm curved westward, until turning north on September 7. A high-pressure area transitioned into a trough, causing Flossie to re-curve northeastward and generating strong upper-level winds.

On September 8, Flossie was downgraded to a tropical depression. After the trough began weakening, favorable conditions returned, allowing Flossie to re-strengthen into a tropical storm on September 10. Flossie then decelerated and became nearly stationary on September 12. Around that time, the storm was upgraded to a hurricane. Further intensification continued, and Flossie peaked with winds of  early on September 13. The storm began turned nearly due northward and began weakening.

Hurricane Greta 

A tropical wave developed into a tropical depression near Trinidad on September 13. By the following day, the depression strengthened into Tropical Storm Greta. It headed westward to west-northwestward across the Caribbean Sea and slowly intensified, becoming a hurricane on September 16. The rate of intensification increased as Greta was approaching the northwestern Caribbean Sea. Although the storm remained offshore, land interaction caused significant weakening. The storm rapidly weakened inland over Central America, but survived its passage and eventually became Hurricane Olivia in the Eastern Pacific Ocean.

Early in its duration, Greta produced heavy rainfall in the Netherlands Antilles. With a similar path to Hurricane Fifi four years prior, Greta threatened to reproduce the devastating effects of the catastrophic storm; however, damage and loss of life was significantly less than feared. In Honduras, about 1,200 homes were damaged, about half of which in towns along the coastline. The storm damaged about 75% of the houses on Roatán along the offshore Bay Islands, and there was one death in the country. In the Belize Barrier Reef, Greta downed trees and produced high waves, while on the mainland, there was minimal flooding despite a high storm surge. In Dangriga where it made landfall, the hurricane damaged or destroyed 125 houses and the primary hospital. In Belize City, a tornado flipped over a truck and damaged four houses. Damage in Belize was estimated at $25 million, and there were four deaths.

Tropical Storm Hope 

A mid-tropospheric low-pressure area developed over the Southeastern United States on September 10. Over the next few days, the depression tracked east-northeastward to eastward. While strengthening into a subtropical storm on September 15, it passed just north of Bermuda, but produced only  of rain on the island. The storm then made a brief dip to the east-southeast, before resuming its east-northeastward course on September 16. Beginning on the following day, satellite imagery indicated that the system was acquiring tropical characteristics. As a result, it was reclassified as Tropical Storm Hope at 0600 UTC on September 17.

Because Hope remained out of range of reconnaissance aircraft flights, the National Hurricane Center relied on ships and satellite estimates. After becoming a tropical cyclone, Hope began to accelerate while slowly intensifying.

Tropical Storm Irma 

During the next two days, thunderstorm activity gradually increased around the circulation center as the storm drifted northward. On October 2, the storm had taken the appearance of a tropical storm on satellite photographs, and upper-level anticyclonic flow over the center of the storm was evident on satellite time-lapse movies. By the afternoon of October 4, the system had acquired the characteristics of a tropical storm and was named Irma; gale-force winds extended  from the center of circulation.

On October 5, Irma turned towards the north-northeast and passed about midway between the central and western Azores. Although Irma passed near parts of the western and central Azores with gale-force winds in some areas, no reports of damage or casualties caused by Irma were received. It was noted that heavy rains may have occurred on some of the mountainous islands as Irma passed.

Tropical Storm Juliet 

A weak tropical wave emerged into the Atlantic Ocean from the west coast of Africa on September 30. The wave moved west-northwestward and was centered well east of the Leeward Islands on October 6, when satellite imagery indicated that deep convection became much more concentrated. The following day, ship reports noted that a closed circulation was developing. Around midday on October 8, the depression strengthened into Tropical Storm Juliet.

The storm then accelerated and curved northwestward, northward, and then northeastward. On October 11, Juliet merged with a frontal zone, while located west-southwest of Bermuda.

Hurricane Kendra 

In late October, a tropical wave and an area of disturbed weather combined in the northwestern Caribbean, before crossing Puerto Rico. Early on the following day, it strengthened into Tropical Storm Kendra. The storm quickly intensified while moving either north or north-northwestward and became a hurricane late on October 29. Kendra continued north-northeastward or northeastward, before being absorbed by an extratropical cyclone while located west-northwest of Bermuda early on November 1.

Mudslides and flooding from the heavy precipitation left many roads impassable, washed out or collapsed several bridges, and caused considerable damage to agriculture, especially livestock. Additionally, one fatality occurred and 1,710 families fled their homes for shelters. Damage in Puerto Rico reached $6 million. A high-pressure area and Kendra combined produced strong winds and abnormally high tides along the East Coast of the United States, though no damage was reported.

Other systems 
In addition to the 12 other tropical cyclones, there were several tropical depressions that developed during the season. The first of which formed over the central Gulf of Mexico on June 21. The depression moved northeastward toward Florida and strengthened slightly. It dissipated by late on June 22. The system moved generally westward and intensified into a strong tropical depression, before dissipating two days later. It tracked westward without significantly intensifying, and passed through the Windward Islands over Bequia on the following day. The depression continued westward and passed near Aruba on August 9. It eventually traversed the Caribbean Sea, and made landfall to the south of Bluefields, Nicaragua on August 11. The depression dissipated shortly thereafter.

A tropical depression formed in the central Gulf of Mexico on August 9. The storm moved northward and struck southeastern Plaquemines Parish, Louisiana before dissipating the next day. By August 30, another depression developed in the north-central Gulf of Mexico. The system tracked generally eastward and avoided landfall. It dissipated around midday on September 1. Tropical Depression Eight developed over western Senegal around 1200 UTC on September 3. The depression initially headed west-southwestward and soon entered the Atlantic Ocean. Between late on September 4 and early on September 5, the system passed south of Cape Verde. Later that day, the storm began curving west-northwestward. By early on September 7, it was heading northwestward and then turned to the north-northwest the next day. The depression moved northward between September 9 and September 10, before re-curving to the northeast.

At 1200 UTC on September 8, Tropical Depression Nine developed over the west-central Gulf of Mexico. Moving generally westward, the depression made landfall south of La Pesca, Tamaulipas, around midday on September 10. The system rapidly weakened inland and dissipated later that day. Another tropical depression formed over western Senegal on September 18. It moved westward across the Atlantic Ocean before curving west-northwestward about three days later. On September 25, the depression moved northwestward and then northward by September 28. The next tropical depression developed in the Gulf of Mexico just offshore Campeche on September 21. Moving west-northwestward, the depression made landfall near Tampico on September 23, shortly before dissipating.

The depression initially moved south-southwestward, before curving southwestward by the following day. It then turned west-northwestward on October 15. Late the next day, the depression turned abruptly northward. It moved generally westward and dissipated about halfway between the Lesser Antilles and the west coast of Africa on October 29. Moving north-northeastward, the depression turned northeastward by the next day.

Storm names 
The following names were used for named storms that formed in the north Atlantic basin in 1978. Storms were named Amelia, Bess, Cora, Flossie, Hope, Irma and Juliet for the first time in 1978. This was the last year that only female names were used for Atlantic hurricanes.

Retirement 

The name Greta was retired after the 1978 season.

Season effects 
This is a table of the storms in 1978 and their landfall(s), if any. Deaths in parentheses are additional and indirect (an example of an indirect death would be a traffic accident), but are still storm-related. Damage and deaths include totals while the storm was extratropical or a wave or low.

See also 

 List of Atlantic hurricanes
 Atlantic hurricane season
 1978 Pacific hurricane season
 1978 Pacific typhoon season
 1978 North Indian Ocean cyclone season
 Australian region cyclone seasons: 1977–78, 1978–79
 South Pacific cyclone seasons: 1977–78, 1978–79
 South-West Indian Ocean cyclone seasons: 1977–78, 1978–79

Notes

References

External links 

 WPC rainfall page for 1978 tropical cyclones
 Monthly Weather Review

 
Articles which contain graphical timelines